The Antoine de Saint Exupéry Museum   is a museum of air mail in Tarfaya, Morocco. Founded in 2004, it is devoted to author and aviator Antoine de Saint-Exupéry (1900–1944), who lived there for two years, from 1927 to 1929, and found there the inspiration for much of his literary work.

In 1927, Saint-Exupéry was appointed chief of the stopover airfield in the Tarfaya region, formerly known as Cape Juby. Tarfaya opened the museum in 2004 to recount the history of the aviation company Aéropostale and its route from Toulouse to Saint-Louis, Senegal. The museum is the principal attraction for visitors to the town.

Citations 

Antoine de Saint-Exupéry
Museums in Morocco
Tarfaya